General elections were in Belize on 30 October 1974. Belizeans elected 18 members to the House of Representatives. The elections were the first since the country was officially renamed from British Honduras in 1973.

The ruling People's United Party (PUP) won the largest share (12) of seats in the elections. The United Democratic Party – formed the previous year by a merger of the National Independence Party, People's Development Movement and Liberal Party – ran for the first time in this election, winning six seats. The UDP fielded candidates nationwide except in Corozal District, where it supported candidates from the Corozal United Front. The UDP absorbed the CUF after the election.

Results

References

Belize
General elections in Belize
General
Belize
Belize